Cors Bryn-y-Gaer is a Site of Special Scientific Interest near Hirwaun in Rhondda Cynon Taf, South Wales.

See also
List of Sites of Special Scientific Interest in Mid & South Glamorgan

Sites of Special Scientific Interest in Rhondda Cynon Taf